The Children Act 2004 (c 31) is an Act of the Parliament of the United Kingdom.

The Act amended the Children Act 1989, largely in consequence of the Victoria Climbié inquiry.

The Act is now the basis for most official administration that is considered helpful to children, notably bringing all local government functions of children's welfare and education under the statutory authority of local Directors of Children's Services. The Act also created the ContactPoint database; this, however, has since been axed.

Purpose
The Act was created with a certain set of goals. Its primary purpose was to give boundaries and help for local authorities and/or other entities to better regulate official intervention in the interests of children.

History
The long history of children's welfare legislation had given rise to numerous unco-ordinated official powers and functions, even within the same local  authorities, resulting in the tragic maladministration seen in the Climbié case. Along with the Children Act 1989 and the Children Act 2004, there were reports in 2002, 2003, and 2004–05. Each Act has progressively attempted to improve the legal powers and official functions related to children in all forms, and to make official provision for children. In family courts this version of the act is very rarely referred to with the Children's Act 1989 more favourably used.

General
This Act's ultimate purpose is to make the UK better and safer for children of all ages. The idea behind the Act is to promote (co-ordination) between multiple official entities to improve the overall well-being of children. The 2004 Act also specifically provided for including and affecting disabled children.

Local Children's Safeguarding Boards
Section 13 provides for the creation and multi-agency representation of a Local Children's Safeguarding Board in each council area.

Repeals
This Act made repeals and amendments to numerous statutes:
 Children Act 1989
 Education Act 1996 
 Education Act 1997
 School Standards and Framework Act 1998
 Learning and Skills Act 2000
 Adoption and Children Act 2002
 Education Act 2002
 Children and Young Persons Act 1933 
 Children and Young Persons Act 1963
 Local Authority Social Services Act 1970 
 Local Government Act 1972 
 Mental Health Act 1983 
 Police and Criminal Evidence Act 1984
 Local Government and Housing Act 1989
 Criminal Justice Act 1991 
 Crime (Sentences) Act 1997
 Crime and Disorder Act 1998
 Powers of Criminal Courts (Sentencing) Act 2000  
 Local Government Act 2000
 Criminal Justice and Court Services Act 2000
 Criminal Justice Act 2003

Section 67 - Commencement
The following orders have been made under this section:
The Children Act 2004 (Commencement No. 1) Order 2005 (S.I. 2005/394 (C. 18))
The Children Act 2004 (Commencement No. 2) Order 2005 (S.I. 2005/700 (W. 59) (C. 30))
The Children Act 2004 (Commencement No. 3) Order 2005 (S.I. 2005/847 (C. 35))
The Children Act 2004 (Commencement No. 4 and Savings) (England) Order 2005 (S.I. 2005/2298 (C. 97))
The Children Act 2004 (Commencement No. 5) Order 2005 (S.I. 2005/3464 (C. 145))
The Children Act 2004 (Commencement No. 5) (Wales) Order 2005 (S.I. 2005/3363 (C. 260) (W. 143))
The Children Act 2004 (Commencement No. 6) (Wales) Order 2006 (S.I. 2006/885 (W. 85) (C. 23))
The Children Act 2004 (Commencement No. 7) (Wales) Order 2006 (S.I. 2006/870 (W. 80) (C. 20))
The Children Act 2004 (Commencement No. 8) Order 2006 (S.I. 2006/927 (C. 24))
The Children Act 2004 (Commencement No. 8) (Wales) Order 2008 (S.I. 2008/1904 (W. 182))
The Children Act 2004 (Commencement No. 9) Order 2008 (S.I. 2008/752 (C. 33))

Notes

References

External links
 Children Act Report
 Description
 Explanation

United Kingdom Acts of Parliament 2004
Children's rights in England
Children's rights in Wales
2004 in England
2004 in Wales
English family law